ES-Les Paul is a Memphis Gibson branded semi-hollow guitar guitar produced in Memphis Tennessee from 2014 to 2016. It was produced with several different variations including a model with no f holes.

Background
Normal Gibson Les Pauls weights range from 8.1 – 9.7 pounds, with an average of 8.86 lbs. The Gibson guitar company wanted to create a lighter guitar by creating weight relieved guitars beginning in 1987. Creating a hollow body guitar was the culmination of Gibson's efforts to make lighter Les Pauls.

Specifications
The Es-Les Paul was produced in several models, including, Memphis ES-Les Paul Black Beauty (3 pickups). They also produced the guitar in the limited ES-Les Paul with Bigsby and ES-Les Paul VOS and in Goldtop. The guitars came with PAF-style Memphis Historic Spec (MHS) pickups and a rounded C-style neck shape. Most of the ES-Les Pauls came with F holes. The guitar's neck was made of mahogany and the back and sides were laminated maple/poplar with a walnut stain. There is a mahogany block running through the body making the guitar semi-hollow. The guitar is bound with aged-cream pickguard and binding, and it has a black-faced headstock.

Gibson also made a number of ES-Les Pauls without f-holes.

References

Gibson Les Paul
ES-Les Paul